Meredith Coloma is a Canadian musician and luthier from Vancouver.

Born in Vancouver, Coloma grew up in Canada, Chile and Taiwan. She attended the Lee Strasbourg Institute in New York City. As a teenager, she apprenticed under professional luthiers, including Roger Sadowsky.

Coloma went on to start her own guitar-making business in Vancouver. She has earned recognition for entering the male-dominated field of guitar-making as a young woman. She is known for her handcrafted gypsy jazz guitars, mandolins, violins, ukuleles, acoustic guitars and electric guitars.

A singer-songwriter, Coloma was a finalist in the 2012 International Songwriting Competition in Nashville. She is a co-founder of the Vancouver International Guitar Festival.

References

Living people
Canadian luthiers
Musicians from Vancouver
Canadian women guitarists
Canadian musical instrument makers
Year of birth missing (living people)